Fraser Valley East was a federal electoral district in British Columbia, Canada, that was  represented in the House of Commons of Canada from 1968 to 1997.

This riding was created in 1966 from parts of Fraser Valley, Kamloops and Okanagan Boundary ridings.

It was abolished in 1996 when it was merged into the Fraser Valley riding.

It initially consisted of:
 the Fraser-Cheam Regional District; and
 the part of the Central Fraser Valley Regional District lying east of Bradner Road in Matsqui District Municipality.

In 1987, it was redefined to consist of:
 the Fraser-Cheam Regional District;
 the part of Central Fraser Regional District lying east of a line drawn from the north boundary of the regional district south to Glenmore Road, along that road and the British Columbia Hydro & Power Railway right-of-way to the south boundary of Matsqui District Municipality, and west and south along that boundary to the southeast corner of Matsqui.

Members of Parliament
This riding elected the following Members of Parliament:

Election results

See also 

 List of Canadian federal electoral districts
 Past Canadian electoral districts

External links
Riding history from the Library of Parliament

Former federal electoral districts of British Columbia